HECT domain E3 ubiquitin protein ligase 4 is a protein that in humans is encoded by the HECTD4 gene.

References

Further reading